This is a list of wars involving the Republic of Iraq and its predecessor states.

Other armed conflicts involving Iraq

 Wars during Mandatory Iraq
 Ikhwan raid on South Iraq 1921
 Smaller conflicts, revolutions, coups and periphery conflicts
 Simele massacre 1933
 Joint Operation Arvand 1969, Iranian show of force that Iraq did not resist
 Kurdish rebellion of 1983 (part of Iran–Iraq War)
 Iraqi no-fly zones conflict, 1991–2003
 Kurdistan Islamist conflict, 2001–2004 (fought on de jure Iraqi territory, but with no Iraqi involvement)

References

 
Iraq
Military history of Iraq
Wars